Kazakhstan has a downturn in the development of telecommunications when compared to the rest of the European Union. However, it is increasing rapidly with each year, and it has one of the most advanced telecoms sectors in Central Asia.

The largest telecommunication company in Kazakhstan is Kazakhtelecom.

Fixed line
The number of fixed-line connections is gradually increasing, and teledensity is about 20 per 100 people. There are 5.928 million lines in use.

Mobile Usage
Mobile-cellular usage is rapidly growing, with subscriptions exceeding 50 per 100 people. There are 14,830,000 mobile cell phones. In 2019, there were 25.72 million connections made by mobile phones.

Internet Usage 

In 2019, there were 15.16 million internet users in Kazakhstan.

Other
Radio broadcast stations: AM 60, FM 17, shortwave 9 (1998)

Radios: 6.47 million (1997); 12 million (2009);

Television broadcast stations: 12 (plus 9 repeaters) (1998); 149 (2009);

Internet Service Providers (ISPs): 10 (with their own international channels) (2001); 22 (2009);

Internet hosts: 33,217 (2007); 80,000 (2009);

Internet users: 100,000 (2002); 400,000 (2005); 1,247,000 (2006); 3,130,000 (2008); 4,700,000  (2009);

Internet country code (Top level domain): KZ

See also

Kazakhtelecom
Kaznet
Kazpost
.kz

References

 
Kazakhstan
Kazakhstan
Kazakhstan